KZUZ (93.5 FM) is a radio station licensed to Show Low, Arizona, United States. The station is currently owned by Petracom of Holbrook, LLC. It has a country music format simulcast with KZUA in Holbrook.

References

External links
 

ZUZ